Qalay-I-Zal District,  also spelled Qala-i-Zal, is situated in the western part of Kunduz Province, northern Afghanistan. It borders Balkh Province to the west and Tajikistan to the north along the Panj, Vakhsh and Amu Darya rivers. To the east it borders Imam Sahib District and to the south Kunduz and Chahar dara districts. Qalay-I-Zal River flows through the district and divides it in two parts. The population is 60,600 (2006) - 60% Turkmen and 40% Pashtun. The district is almost a desert and only the irrigated land is arable. The agriculture and  carpet weaving are the most important sources of income.

The district was fought over with the Taliban in the War in Afghanistan.

The Taliban captured Qalay-I-Zal District on 6 May 2017 during their 2017 spring offensive; Operation Mansoori.

References

External links 
 AIMS District Map
 District Profile

Districts of Kunduz Province